Teratomyrmex is a genus of ants in the subfamily Formicinae. The genus is known only from forested areas on the east coast of Australia.

Species
 Teratomyrmex greavesi McAreavey, 1957
 Teratomyrmex substrictus Shattuck & O'Reilly, 2013
 Teratomyrmex tinae Shattuck & O'Reilly, 2013

References

External links

Formicinae
Ant genera
Hymenoptera of Australia